Tomas Milian (born Tomás Quintín Rodríguez-Varona Milián Salinas de la Fé y Álvarez de la Campa; 3 March 1933 – 22 March 2017) was a Cuban-born actor and singer with American and Italian citizenship, known for the emotional intensity and humor he brought to starring roles in European genre films.

A student of Lee Strasberg, Milian studied method acting at the Actors Studio in New York City. In Italy, he was discovered by director Mauro Bolognini and appeared in supporting roles in several drama films during the late 1950s and early 1960s, including Bad Girls Don't Cry (1959) and as Raphael in Carol Reed's The Agony and the Ecstasy (1965). Throughout the late-1960s and early-1970s, Milian established himself as a dynamic leading actor in a series of Spaghetti Western films, most notably The Big Gundown (1966), Django Kill... If You Live, Shoot! (1967), as well as Sergio Corbucci's parody of the genre The White, the Yellow, and the Black (1975). Dennis Hopper also cast Milian in his 1971 art-house film, The Last Movie.

Following a decline in the popularity of Spaghetti Westerns, Milian transitioned to roles in poliziottesco films. After receiving acclaim for his performance as a psychotic killer in Almost Human (1974), he made appearances in Emergency Squad (1974), The Tough Ones (1976) and The Cynic, the Rat and the Fist (1977). After returning to the United States in 1985, Milian continued to perform supporting roles in film productions, including JFK (1991), Amistad (1997), Traffic (2000) and The Lost City (2005).

Biography
Milian was born in Havana as the son of a Cuban general. His father was arrested, jailed, and later committed suicide on December 31, 1946. Milián then decided to leave Cuba and pursue his wishes of being an actor. He settled in the United States to study at New York's Actors Studio and later became an American citizen. In 1969, he became a naturalized Italian citizen.

Career
After starting a career in the United States, Milian went to Italy in 1958 to take part in a theatre festival in Spoleto. He eventually decided to relocate to Italy, where he lived for over 25 years, becoming a very successful performer. His first film part in Italy was in the 1959 picture La notte brava. Although his voice was usually dubbed due to his accent, Milián performed his lines in Italian (or in English, depending on the film). He initially starred in arthouse movies and worked with directors such as Mauro Bolognini and Luchino Visconti.

After five years of making what he deemed "intellectual" movies, Milián was unhappy with his contract with producer Franco Cristaldi and thought of going back to the United States. Needing money to start over, he took the opportunity to star as a bandit in a Spaghetti Western called The Bounty Killer. The film boosted his career, and ultimately resulted in his staying in Italy. He became a star of the Spaghetti Western genre, where he often played Mexican bandits or revolutionaries, roles in which he spoke in his real voice. He starred in The Ugly Ones (1966), The Big Gundown (1966), Django Kill... If You Live, Shoot! (1967), Face to Face (1967), Run, Man, Run (1968), Death Sentence (1968), Tepepa (1969), Compañeros (1970), Sonny and Jed (1972), Life Is Tough, Eh Providence? (1972) and Four of the Apocalypse (1975).

As the Spaghetti Westerns dwindled, Milián remained a star in many genre films, playing both villains and heroes in various polizieschi movies. He starred with Barbara Bouchet in the giallo Don't Torture a Duckling. In addition to his role in Almost Human (1974) and appearances in Emergency Squad (1974), The Tough Ones (1976) and The Cynic, the Rat and the Fist (1977), he also appeared in two film series - Bruno Corbucci's Nico Giraldi series (1976-1984, beginning with The Cop in Blue Jeans) and Umberto Lenzi's Er Monnezza films (1976-1980, beginning with Free Hand for a Tough Cop). His other films during this period include the giallo Don't Torture a Duckling (1972) and the non-genre films The Last Movie (1971), Luna (1979),  Identification of a Woman (1982) and Monsignor (1982).

He later turned to comedy, playing the recurrent characters of petty thief Monnezza and Serpico-like police officer Nico Giraldi in a variety of crime-comedy pictures. Although his voice was dubbed most of the time by Ferruccio Amendola, Milián wrote his own lines in Roman slang. Milián's inventive use of romanesco (Roman dialect) made him a cult performer in Italy. Bruno Corbucci, the director of many of these films commented, "At the cinemas as soon as Tomás Milián appeared on the screen, when he made a wisecrack and in the heaviest situations, then it was a pandemonium, it was like being at the stadium." As Milián used similar makeups and accents in portraying both characters, Monnezza and Nico were occasionally confused by Italian audiences, who sometimes referred erroneously to them both as Monnezza, or Er Monnezza (Da trash in Roman slang ), and still closely associate Milián with these performances.

Milián also appeared in non-genre pictures, such as Bernardo Bertolucci's La Luna, for which he won a Nastro d'Argento for Best supporting Actor, and Michelangelo Antonioni's Identification of a Woman.

As he grew older, Milián decided to go back to the United States. He appeared in Sydney Pollack's Havana, Steven Spielberg's Amistad, Steven Soderbergh's Traffic as well as Andy García's The Lost City, about Revolutionary Cuba. He has also played many roles on stage. In 2005, he portrayed Generalisimo Rafael Leonidas Trujillo Molina in the film version of Mario Vargas Llosa's novel The Feast of the Goat.

Milian was found dead from a stroke at his home in Miami on 22 March 2017.

On October 11, 2017 he received the Leone in Memoriam award at the 7º Almería Western Film Festival. It was picked up by his friend Luis Santeiro.

Filmography 

 Decoy, Ep. "Fiesta at Midnight" (1958, Michael Gordon) as Juan Ortega
 The Millionaire, Ep. "The Louise Benton Story" (1959, James Sheldon) as Second Sailor
 Bad Girls Don't Cry (1959, Mauro Bolognini) as Moretto
 Il bell'Antonio (1960, Mauro Bolognini) as Edoardo
 Silver Spoon Set (1960, Francesco Maselli) as Alberto De Matteis
 The Mishap (1961, Alberto Lattuada) as Thomas Plemian
 A Day for Lionhearts (1961, Nanni Loy) as Gino Migliacci
 Day by Day, Desperately (1961, Alfredo Giannetti) as Dario Dominici
 Boccaccio '70 (1962, Luchino Visconti) as Conte Ottavio
 Disorder (1962, Franco Brusati) as Bruno
 La banda Casaroli (1962, Florestano Vancini) as Gabriele Ingenis
 Ro.Go.Pa.G., "La ricotta" (1963, Pier Paolo Pasolini) as Centurione
 Mare matto (1963, Renato Castellani) as Efsio
 I Kill, You Kill (1965, Gianni Puccini) as Lorenzo Berti
 Time of Indifference (1965, Francesco Maselli) as Michele
 The Camp Followers (1965, Valerio Zurlini) as Lt. Gaetano Martino
 The Agony and the Ecstasy (1965, Carol Reed) as Raphael
 Madamigella di Maupin (1966, Mauro Bolognini) as Chevalier d'Albert
 I soldi (1965, Gianni Puccini) as Bob
 The Ugly Ones (1966, Eugenio Martin) as José Gómez
 The Big Gundown (1967, Sergio Sollima) as Cuchillo Sanchez
 Face to Face (1967, Sergio Sollima) as Beau Bennet
 Django Kill... If You Live, Shoot! (1967, Giulio Questi) as The Stranger
 Bandits in Milan (1968, Carlo Lizzani) as Comissario Walter Basevi
 Death Sentence (1968, Mario Lanfranchi) as O'Hara
 Run, Man, Run! (1968, Sergio Sollima) as Cuchillo Sanchez
 A Fine Pair (1968, Francesco Maselli) as Roger
 Tepepa (1969, Giulio Petroni) as Jesus Maria "Tepepa" Moran
 Beatrice Cenci (1969, Lucio Fulci) as Olimpio Calvetti
 Where Are You Going All Naked? (1969, Pasquale Festa Campanile) as Manfredo
 Compañeros (1970, Sergio Corbucci) as El Vasco
 Viva Cangaceiro (1970, Giovanni Fago) as Espedito
 The Cannibals (1970, Liliana Cavani) as Emone
 The Designated Victim (1971, Maurizio Lucidi) as Stefano Augenti
 The Last Movie (1971, Dennis Hopper) as the Priest
 Ripped Off (1972, Franco Prosperi) as the Stranger
 Sonny and Jed (1972, Sergio Corbucci) as Jed Trigado
 Don't Torture a Duckling (1972, Lucio Fulci) as Andrea Martelli
 Counselor at Crime (1973, Alberto De Martino) as Thomas Accardo
 Life Is Tough, Eh Providence? (1972, Giulio Petroni) as Provvidenza
 Emergency Squad (1974, Stelvio Massi) as Tomas Ravelli
 Almost Human (1974, Umberto Lenzi) as Giulio Sacchi
 Silent Action (1975, Sergio Martino) as Rienzi
 Syndicate Sadists (1975, Umberto Lenzi) as Rambo
 The White, the Yellow, and the Black (1975, Sergio Corbucci) as Sakura
 Four of the Apocalypse (1975, Lucio Fulci) as Chaco
  (1975, Yves Boisset)
 Sex with a Smile (1976, Sergio Martino) as Cavaliere Marelli
 The Tough Ones (1976, Umberto Lenzi) as Vincenzo Moretto
 The Cop in Blue Jeans (1976, Bruno Corbucci), as Nico Giraldi
 The Twist (1976, Claude Chabrol) as The Detective
 Hit Squad (1976, Bruno Corbucci), as Nico Giraldi
 Young, Violent, Dangerous (1976, Romolo Guerrieri) as the Commissioner
 The Cynic, the Rat and the Fist (1977, Umberto Lenzi) as Luigi Maietto
 Free Hand for a Tough Cop (1977, Umberto Lenzi) as Sergio Marazzi
 Brothers Till We Die (1977, Umberto Lenzi) as Sergio Marazzi/The Hunchback
 Destruction Force (1977, Stelvio Massi) as Sergio Marazzi
 Squadra antitruffa (1977, Bruno Corbucci), as Nico Giraldi
 Little Italy (1978, Bruno Corbucci), as Nico Giraldi
 The Gang That Sold America (1979, Bruno Corbucci), as Nico Giraldi
 Assassinio sul Tevere (1979, Bruno Corbucci), as Nico Giraldi
 La Luna (1979, Bernardo Bertolucci) as Giuseppe
 Winter Kills (1979, William Richert) as Frank Mayo
 Il lupo e l'agnello (1980, Francesco Massaro) as Cuckoo
 Delitto a Porta Romana (1980, Bruno Corbucci), as Nico Giraldi
 Manolesta (1981, Pasquale Festa Campanile) as Gino Quirino
 Crime at the Chinese Restaurant (1981, Bruno Corbucci), as Nico Giraldi
 Uno contro l'altro, praticamente amici (1981, Bruno Corbucci) as Quinto Cecione
 Delitto sull'autostrada (1982, Bruno Corbucci), as Nico Giraldi
 Identification of a Woman (1982, Michelangelo Antonioni) as Niccolò
 Monsignor (1982, Frank Perry) as Father Francisco
 Cat and Dog (1982, Bruno Corbucci) as Tony Roma
 Crime in Formula One (1983, Bruno Corbucci), as Nico Giraldi
 Cop in Drag (1984, Bruno Corbucci), as Nico Giraldi
 King David (1985, Bruce Beresford) as Akiss
 The Equalizer, "Reign of Terror" (1985, Richard Compton) as Immanuel Pena
 Miami Vice, "Bought and Paid For" (1985, John Nicolella) as Octavio Arroyo
 Salome (1986, Claude d'Anna) as Herod II
 The Equalizer, "Shadow Play" (1987, Russ Mayberry) as Duran
 Distant Lights (1987, Aurelio Chiesa) as Bernardo Bernardi
 Cat Chaser (1989, Abel Ferrara) as Andres DeBoya
 Massacre Play (1989, Damiano Damiani) as Clem Da Silva
 Drug Wars: The Camarena Story (1990, Brian Gibson) as Florentino Ventura
 Revenge (1990, Tony Scott) as Cesar
 Havana (1990, Sydney Pollack) as Colonel Menocal
 Money (1991, Steven Hilliard Stern) as Robert Zarra
 JFK (1991, Oliver Stone) as Leopoldo
 Frannie's Turn (1992, various) as Joseph Escobar
 Murder, She Wrote, "Day of the Dead" (1992, Anthony Shaw) as Enrico Montejano
 Nails (1992, John Flynn) as Pedro Herrara
 Screenplay, "Bitter Harvest" (1992, Simon Cellan Jones) as Ramon Cires
 Love, Honor & Obey: The Last Mafia Marriage (1993, John Patterson) as Joe Profaci
 Marilyn & Bobby: Her Final Affair (1993, Bradford May) as Calro Rossi
 The Burning Season (1994, John Frankenheimer) as Darli Alves
 The Cowboy Way (1994, Gregg Champion) as Manny Huerta
 Fools Rush In (1997, Andy Tennant) as Tomas Fuentes
 Oz (1997, various) as Ricardo Alvarez
 Amistad (1997, Steven Spielberg) as Ángel Calderón de la Barca y Belgrano
 The Yards (2000, James Gray) as Manuel Sequeira
 Law & Order (2000, Christopher Misiano) as Colonel Emilio Pantoya
 For Love or Country: The Arturo Sandoval Story (2000, Joseph Sargent) as Sosa
 Traffic (2000, Steven Soderbergh) as General Arturo Salazar
 The Hire: Ambush (short, 2001, John Frankenheimer)
 Washington Heights (2002, Alfredo De Villa) as Eddie
 The Lost City (2005, Andy García) as Don Federico Fellove
 The Feast of the Goat (2005, Luis Llosa) as Rafael Leonidas Trujillo
 Tomas Milian: Acting on Instinct (2013, Ozzy Inguanzo) as himself
 Fugly! (2014, Alfredo De Villa) as Gramps

References

Further reading
 Giorgio Navarro, Fabio Zanello, Tomas Milian. Er cubbano de Roma, Molino, 1999; .
 Max Serio, Tomas Milian: The Tough Bandit, the Rough Cop and the Filthy Rat in Italian Cinema, Mediane, 2009; .
 Gordiano Lupi, Tomas Milian, il trucido e lo sbirro, Profondo Rosso Editore, 2011; .

External links

Tomás Milián official site 

Tomás Milián interview 
Tomas Milian in The Designated Victim – TCM's Movie Morlocks

1933 births
2017 deaths
Bisexual male actors
American male film actors
American male voice actors
Cuban emigrants to Italy
Cuban emigrants to the United States
Italian male film actors
Outstanding Performance by a Cast in a Motion Picture Screen Actors Guild Award winners
Male actors from Miami
Male Spaghetti Western actors
Male actors from Havana
Nastro d'Argento winners
Hispanic and Latino American male actors
Cuban bisexual people
Italian bisexual people
Cuban LGBT actors
Italian LGBT actors
LGBT Hispanic and Latino American people
American bisexual actors
LGBT people from Florida